Henri Leconte (born 4 July 1963) is a French former professional tennis player. He reached the men's singles final at the French Open in 1988, won the French Open men's doubles title in 1984, and helped France win the Davis Cup in 1991. Leconte's career-high singles ranking was world No. 5.

Biography and career
Leconte first came to the tennis world's attention as an outstanding junior player who won the French Open junior title in 1981.  He turned professional that year and won his first career doubles title at Bologna, and his first top-level singles title the following year, 1982, in Stockholm. Leconte played in the Davis Cup final for the first time in 1982, when France was defeated 4–1 by the United States.

Leconte teamed up with Yannick Noah to win the men's doubles title at the French Open in 1984. In 1985, Leconte and Noah reached a second Grand Slam doubles final at the US Open, where they finished runners-up. Leconte reached his career-high doubles ranking of world No. 6 in 1985. In singles in 1985, Leconte reached the quarterfinals of the French Open and Wimbledon, the latter run of which included a dazzling win over world no. 2, Ivan Lendl, in the fourth round.

1986 saw Leconte reach two Grand Slam singles semi-finals at the French Open and Wimbledon, and attain his career-high singles ranking of world No. 5. Leconte also played on the French team that won the World Team Cup that year.

In 1988, Leconte reached the men's singles final at the French Open beating Simon Youl, Bruno Orešar, Horacio de la Peña, Boris Becker, Andrei Chesnokov and Jonas Svensson. In the final, despite strong support from the French crowd, Leconte could not overcome two-time former champion Mats Wilander who defeated him in straight sets.

In 1991, Leconte was involved in the Davis Cup final for a second time. France again faced the US, and this time Leconte defeated Pete Sampras in straight sets in a critical singles rubber, and also teamed with Guy Forget to win the doubles rubber, as France upset the heavily favoured U.S. team 3–1.

In total, Leconte played for France's Davis Cup team for a total of 13 consecutive years, compiling a 41–25 record. He compiled a doubles record of 17–5 and was undefeated with Guy Forget (11 wins), winning his last 14 doubles matches (from March 1985 to July 1993).

Leconte won his final top-level singles title in 1993 in Halle. He also won his final doubles title that year at Indian Wells.

Leconte retired from the professional tour in 1996, having won a total of nine career singles titles and ten doubles titles. Playing on the ATP Champions Tour for over-35's, he formed a doubles partnership with the Iranian player Mansour Bahrami.

He is now the manager of an event company (HL Event) based in Belgium and opened a tennis academy in Fès, Morocco, in 2006.

Since 2010, Leconte has appeared on Australian television as a commentator on the Seven Network's coverage of the Australian Open. There, he obtained a cult following as a result of a zany exhibition doubles performance, and his passionate and often parochial commentary, especially for compatriot Jo-Wilfried Tsonga, whose winning shots he routinely described as "unbelievable!"

In 2014, Leconte appeared as a commentator for the 2014 Australian Open. One match he commentated was the third-round match between Frenchmen Gilles Simon and Jo-Wilfried Tsonga. He has since appeared regularly as a commentator for matches involving French players in the men's draw.

Grand Slam singles performance timeline

Trivia
He participated in 2005 in the second season of La Ferme Célébrités, a TV reality game show. In 2007, his son Maxime also participated in the TV reality game show Secret Story, the French version of Big Brother.
He also appeared as a contestant on BBC Celebrity Masterchef 2017, reaching the semifinals.

Major finals

Grand Slam finals

Singles: 1 (0–1)

Doubles: 2 (1–1)

Masters Series finals

Doubles: 2 (1–1)

Career finals

Singles: 16 (9–7)

Doubles: 19 (10–9)

References

External links

 
 
 
 H Talent Management Henri Leconte client biography

1963 births
French expatriate sportspeople in Switzerland
French male tennis players
French Open champions
French Open junior champions
Hopman Cup competitors
La Ferme Célébrités participants
Living people
Olympic tennis players of France
Tennis players from Geneva
Sportspeople from Pas-de-Calais
Tennis commentators
Tennis players at the 1988 Summer Olympics
Tennis players at the 1992 Summer Olympics
Grand Slam (tennis) champions in men's doubles
Grand Slam (tennis) champions in boys' singles